The 2007 Saint Francis Cougars football team represented the University of Saint Francis, located in Fort Wayne, Indiana, in the 2007 NAIA football season. They were led by head coach Kevin Donley, who served his 10th year as the first and only head coach in the history of Saint Francis football.  The Cougars played their home games at Bishop John D'Arcy Stadium and were members of the Mid-States Football Association (MSFA) Mideast League (MEL). The Cougars finished in 2nd place in the MSFA MEL division, but they received an at-large bid to the 2007 postseason NAIA playoffs.

Schedule 
On September 29, 2007, the Saint Francis loss to Ohio Dominican snapped a 54-game regular season winning streak dating back to 2001.

Ranking movements

References

Saint Francis
Saint Francis Cougars football seasons
Saint Francis Cougars football